Szymon Staśkiewicz (born 3 January 1987) is a Polish modern pentathlete. He competed at the 2012 Summer Olympics.

References

External links
 

1987 births
Living people
Polish male modern pentathletes
Olympic modern pentathletes of Poland
Modern pentathletes at the 2012 Summer Olympics
Modern pentathletes at the 2016 Summer Olympics
World Modern Pentathlon Championships medalists
People from Zielona Góra
Sportspeople from Lubusz Voivodeship